Luciano Chessa (born 12 January 1971, in Sassari, Italy) is a musician, performance/visual/installation artist, and musicologist.

As a composer, conductor, pianist, and musical saw / Vietnamese dan bau soloist, Luciano Chessa has been active in Europe, the U.S., Australia, and South America. Compositions include a piano and percussion duet after Pier Paolo Pasolini's "Petrolio", written for Sarah Cahill and Chris Froh and presented in 2004 at the American Academy in Rome, "Il pedone dell’aria" ("air walker") for orchestra and double children choir, premiered in 2006 at the Auditorium of Turin's Lingotto and subsequently released on DVD, and two works in collaboration with artist Terry Berlier: "Louganis" for piano and TV/VCR combo (performed at the Monday Evening Concerts in 2010) and "Inkless Imagination IV" for viola, mini-bass musical saw, turntables, piano, percussion, FM radios, blimp and video projection (premiered at UC Davis' Mondavi Center by the Empyrean Ensemble).

Among his compositions should be mentioned a large orchestral work commissioned by the Orchestra Filarmonica di Torino, Italy and titled "Ragazzi incoscienti scarabocchiano sulla porta di un negozio fallito an.1902" (reckless children scribble on the door of a failed shop in 1902), "Movements", a multimedia work for 16mm film, dan bau and amplified film projectors produced in collaboration with filmmaker Rick Bahto, "Come un’infanzia", a guitar plus string quartet piece for the Left Coast Chamber Ensemble, and A Heavenly Act, an opera commissioned by SFMOMA and Opera Parallèle with a libretto by Gertrude Stein and video by Kalup Linzy. A Heavenly Act premiered on 19 August 2011, at the Yerba Buena Center for the Arts in San Francisco, in a staged production by the Ensemble Parallèle, conducted by Nicole Paiement and featuring Linzy.

Recent premieres include "LIGHTEST", a SFMOMA commission presented on 16 November 2013, at the SF Columbarium, and "Set and Setting", a San Francisco Contemporary Music Players commission presented on 18 February 2014, at the Yerba Buena Center for the Arts.
Chessa's first record, "Humus" (1997), out on the Italian cult label Destination X, received excellent reviews in all the major Italian musical magazines (Fare Musica, Rumore, Il Mucchio Selvaggio) and was voted by Rockerilla's critics as one of the 10 best international recordings of 1997. His  "Peyrano", which includes recordings produced in the 90s, has been re-released in March 2012 by the Swiss label Skank Bloc Records.

Luciano Chessa has been performing futurist sound poetry for well over 10 years. His reading of Italian poetry to accompany a performance of the Grammy Award Nominated New Century Chamber Orchestra in San Francisco's Herbst Theatre in 2000 was granted with excellent reviews in the San Francisco press, and in 2001 he has given the modern premiere of Francesco Cangiullo's explosive Futurist sound poems "Piedigrotta" and "Serata in onore di Yvonne" to critical acclaim. From the year 1999 to 2004, he has been a member of the UC Davis Gospel Choir, where he served as assistant conductor to Calvin Lymos, the choir's principal director.

As a musicologist, his areas of research competence include twentieth-century, experimental, and late fourteenth-century music (Ars Subtilior). His research on Italian Futurism, which he has presented and published internationally, has shown for the first time the occult relationship between Luigi Russolo's intonarumori and Leonardo da Vinci's mechanical noisemakers. He is author of Luigi Russolo Futurist. Noise, Visual Arts, and the Occult, the first monograph ever to be dedicated to Russolo and The Art of Noises. Published by the University of California Press, the book has received enthusiastic reviews:

"With meticulous attention to primary sources, galvanised by daring leaps of imagination, [Chessa] reveals an array of unorthodox ideas, creative tensions, and contradictions within Russolo's milieu."
[...]
"Chessa's prose embodies the sheer pleasure of discovery through research."
[...]
"The frenzied pace of Chessa's writing retains a visionary edge throughout, and the book itself could be seen as an example of synthesis and dynamism."  (The Wire, June 2012)

"The most comprehensive source of Russolo available in English." (Examiner.com)

"In Luigi Russolo, Futurist: Noise, Visual Arts, and the Occult, composer and San Francisco Conservatory music history professor Luciano Chessa reconstructs Russolo’s life through ambitious archival research, uncovering and digesting esoteric and obscure texts to reverse-engineer how the artist’s eccentric interests influenced his creative output." (Brainpickings.org)

In 2018, he wrote a brief essay on Russolo's ongoing importance in contemporary music for the first ever Argentinean translation of Luigi Russolo's "L'arte dei Rumori", published in 2018 by Dobra Robota Editora. He was also the main guest in the launching of said book in Buenos Aires in December 2017.
Chessa's Futurist expertise has resulted in an invitation by RoseLee Goldberg, General Director of the New York-based Biennale of the Arts PERFORMA to direct the first reconstruction project of Russolo's earliest intonarumori orchestra, and to curate concerts of music specifically commissioned for this orchestra. The new intonarumori ensemble has been unveiled in October 2009 at San Francisco's YBCA's Novellus Theater and then presented in NYC's Town Hall in November for PERFORMA 09—both events being co-produced by PERFORMA and SFMOMA, and featuring Minna Choi's Magik*Magik Orchestra. This production presented an impressive array of world premieres written by such composers and ensembles as Blixa Bargeld, John Butcher, Tony Conrad, James Fei, Ellen Fullman, Ghostdigital with Finboggi Petusson and Caspar Electronics, Nick Hallett, Carla Kihlstedt + Matthias Bossi, Ulrich Krieger, Joan La Barbara, Pauline Oliveros, Pablo Ortiz, Mike Patton, Anat Pick, Elliott Sharp, Jennifer Walshe, Theresa Wong, Text of Light. The production, also featuring Chessa's L’acoustique ivresse, for bassvoice and intonarumori ensemble and the modern premiere of Russolo's Risveglio di una città in a new diplomatic edition by Chessa, was hailed by The New York Times among the best events in the arts of 2009. In September 2010 Chessa presented the intonarumori in the first Italian appearance: a concert at the MART in Rovereto, Italy, as part of the Festival Transart, which featured performances by Nicholas Isherwood and included Sylvano Bussotti's "VARIAZIONE RUSSOLO-Slancio d'angoli", and two new commissioned pieces by Margareth Kammerer and Teho Teardo. In March 2011 Chessa conducted the Orchestra of Futurist Noise Intoners in a sold-out concert for Berliner Festspiele MaerzMusik Festival, which included "Gramophone Saraswati," a new piece by Amelia Cuni and Werner Durand. The Orchestra of Futurist Noise Intoners is currently touring internationally.
In December 2011 Chessa conducted the project with the New World Symphony in their new Frank Gehry designed New World Center's Concert Hall packed to capacity as part of a Performa-curated special event to celebrate the tenth anniversary of Art Basel | Miami Beach. The performance included Joan La Barbara's "Striations" and the premiere of Lee Ranaldo's "It All Begins Now (Whose Streets? Our Streets!)". Both pieces featured their respective composers performing alongside Chessa and the New World Symphony.
In May 2013 at the Experimentation Center of the Teatro Colón in Buenos Aires he presented a series of events to celebrate the Centennial of Russolo's Art of Noises. A double LP dedicated to the Orchestra of Futurist Noise Intoners and documenting the first phase of this project has been released on the label Sub Rosa in November 2013. In December 2013 Chessa conducted the Orchestra of Futurist Noise Intoners to a sold-out crowd at the RedCat in Los Angeles. In June 2014 Chessa performed three concerts with Futurist Sound Poetry at the Solomon R. Guggenheim Museum in New York, as part of the retrospective exhibit on Italian Futurism; his voice reading Marinietti's Manifesto and Poetry to accompany Jen Sachs' videos was experienced by all exhibit visitors, from February to September 2014. A new version of Cangiullo's Piedigrotta conceived for the Peter B. Lewis Theater of the Guggenheim Museum, directed, and scored for 5 Neapolitan folk instruments by Chessa, received a standing ovation on 9 June 2014.

Luciano Chessa has been interviewed by the CBS (KPIX/KBHK) television channel as an expert on Italian 1990s hip-hop and by the BBC as Luigi Russolo's foremost scholar. He has been featured in Artforum, Art in America, in the Italian issue of Marie Claire and in the September 2010 Issue of Vogue Italia, and appears in Peter Esmonde's documentary on Ellen Fullman, 5 Variations on a Long String (2010). Chessa teaches at the San Francisco Conservatory of Music, serves in the advisory board of TACET, the international research publication dedicated to Experimental Music of the University of Paris 1 Pantheon-Sorbonne, and collaborates with SF's Italian Cultural Institute. His music is published by RAI TRADE, the Italian National Broadcast Channels' music publishing company, and Edizioni Carrara.

Education
He holds a D.M.A. in Piano performance and a M.A. in composition from the Conservatorio Giovanni Battista Martini in Bologna, Italy, a M.A. magna cum laude in History of Medieval Music from the University of Bologna, and a PhD in Musicology and Music Criticism from the University of California at Davis. He taught and lectured at numerous institutions including St. John's College of Oxford, UK, Columbia University, Harvard University, Sydney's and Melbourne's Conservatories and Universities, the Conservatory of Music in Bologna, UC Davis, UC Berkeley, Stanford University, and EMPAC in the campus of Rensselaer Polytechnic Institute.

See also 
 Futurists and Theosophy

References
English Home Page https://www.lucianochessa.com/

1971 births
Conservatorio Giovanni Battista Martini alumni
Italian composers
Italian male composers
Living people
People from Sassari
University of California, Davis alumni